Lee Go-eun (born November 6, 2009) is a South Korean actress. Lee starred as daughter of Lee Jang-woo's character in the Korean drama Rosy Lovers (2015).

Career 
In January 2022, Lee Go-eun signed an exclusive contract with Big Smile Entertainment.

Filmography

Television series

Film

Awards and nominations

References

External links
 
 Lee Go-eun at Naver 
 
 

2009 births
Living people
South Korean child actresses
South Korean television actresses
South Korean film actresses
IHQ (company) artists